Catherine Aurora Costa ( Bravo; born March 21, 1926) is an American politician who served in the New Jersey General Assembly from the 7th Legislative District from 1982 to 1984 and in the New Jersey Senate from 1984 to 1990.

Born Catherine Aurora Bravo, she married Joseph Costa, an electrical and nuclear engineer. The couple had three children and were married for 65 years until Joseph's death in 2011.

References

1926 births
Possibly living people
Women state legislators in New Jersey
Democratic Party New Jersey state senators
Democratic Party members of the New Jersey General Assembly
20th-century American politicians
20th-century American women politicians